Brocēni is a town in Saldus Municipality in the Courland region of Latvia. The town is situated along the river Ciecere, near lake Cieceres, which contains a large deposit of limestone, which is used in the manufacturing of cement. During the Second World War, a cement and slate factory was built in the town. It is also home to the Starts Brocēni football club.

See also
List of cities in Latvia

References

 
Towns in Latvia
Populated places established in 1992
Saldus Municipality
Courland